Prof. Abdolreza Soudbakhsh (1950 – 21 September 2010) was an Iranian physician and university professor who examined prisoners during the 2009 Iranian election protests.  He was assassinated in front of his medical office at 9pm on September 21, 2010. Jaras News Agency cited that Soudbakhsh had treated and examined prisoners of the Kahrizak detention center, and was under pressure to report all the genital and urinary infections (caused by repetitive rapes) as meningitis, and his resistance to keep his oath was the reason for his assassination.

References

1950 births
2010 deaths
Academic staff of Tehran University of Medical Sciences
People from Bandar-e Anzali
Assassinated Iranian people
2010 murders in Iran
20th-century Iranian physicians
21st-century Iranian physicians